Ewald Tauer (born 8 June 1941) is a German wrestler. He competed in the men's Greco-Roman bantamweight at the 1960 Summer Olympics.

References

1941 births
Living people
German male sport wrestlers
Olympic wrestlers of the United Team of Germany
Wrestlers at the 1960 Summer Olympics
Sportspeople from Munich